was a Japanese model, first Japanese model who worked in Paris, from 1960, to the late 1960s, considered to be a first Japanese supermodel.

Biography
Pierre Cardin met and fell in love with Matsumoto in 1960 during a trip to Japan. She would eventually follow him to Paris where she was Cardin's top model. Known as Miss Hiroko, she was the first ever Japanese model for a French clothing collection.

Matsumoto ended her modeling career in 1967 and married Henry Berghauer, a manager at groupe Pierre Cardin. Berghauer went on to become a manager at Hanae Mori, and later of fashion company Hervé Léger. In 1970, Matsumoto played the prominent part of Kyoko, the Japanese lover, in French director François Truffaut's movie Bed and Board. Many of the dresses worn in the movie were designed by the Hanae Mori fashion company.

A few years later, Hiroko Matsumoto married Jean-Claude Cathalan, who, at the time, was a manager at Roussel Uclaf He later became the president of Revillon, Parfums Caron, Jean-Louis Scherrer and is the current president of Comité Montaigne. Their daughter, Maxime Cathalan, was kidnapped in Neuilly-sur-Seine at the age of 20 months in front of her nurse. The child was returned on 23 June 1975 for a ransom of 1.5 million Franc.

In 2003, Hiroko Cathalan died in Paris at the age of 67 after a long period in the hospital. The cause of her death remains uncertain.

Filmography

References

External links

Japanese female models
People from Tokyo
1936 births
2003 deaths